Ham Yu Haoming (born 14 November 1987) is a Chinese singer, actor, dancer, and host. He was born in Guangzhou, the largest city of Guangdong province. In April 2007, he participated in Hunan TV's Super Boy and won 6th place nationwide, launching his career. Later, Ming signed with EE-Media and Korea Company Doremi Media and traveled to Seoul, South Korea several times for professional training. In 2007, he played as the male lead in large-scale musical drama. In September 2008, Ham Yu Hao Ming participated in Hunan TV and Hong Kong TVB's co-organized "Strictly Come Dancing Season 2" and became Champion. He is also the host of Hunan TV's variety show "Day Day Up." In 2009, he played as the male lead in the film "China Idol Boys" and the TV Series "Meteor Shower." In the same year, he released his first album, "Hug," which was a co-production by China and South Korea.

Career
In April 2007, Yu participated in Hunan TV's organized "Super Boy". He won as Guangzhou's Champion and 6th place nationwide. In the same year, he signed the Doremi Media Record and released his first EP "If I Could Love You".

In March 2008, his album "If I Could Love You" was awarded China's Top 10 Golden Melody "Most Popular Online Songs" and Newcomer Awards. Later, he travelled to Seoul, South Korea for professional training. In September 2008, he participated in Hunan TV and Hong Kong TVB's co-organized "Strictly Come Dancing Season 2" and won Champion.

In October 2010, while shooting for Hunan TV's TV Series "Love In Spring" (formerly known as: I Have A Date With Spring) in Shanghai, he got accidentally burnt during a blast scene and was recuperated for a long time.

On the night of October 25, 2019, the first China Online Movie Week ended. Famous film and television performance artists Yue Hong, Zhang Kaili, Yan Danchen, Hu Xianxu and Huang Mengying appeared on the red carpet, bringing the scene to recite "Light and Shadow Memory". On December 17, 2019, "Empress of the Ming" was broadcast on Hunan TV and he played as Zhu Gaoxu in the series.

Discography

Studio Albums

EP

Singles

Music videos

Filmography

Television series

Film

Musical

TV column plays

Hosting

Awards

Explosive accident
On October 22, 2010, while filming the TV Series I Have a Date with Spring (我和春天有个约会) in Shanghai, Yu was injured in an explosive accident with co-star Selina, suffering third-degree burns over 39% of his body.

References

1987 births
Living people
Musicians from Guangzhou
Super Boy contestants
Chinese male television actors
21st-century Chinese male actors
Male actors from Guangzhou